Samuel Coles House is located in Cherry Hill, Camden County, New Jersey, United States. The house was built in 1743 and was added to the National Register of Historic Places on June 18, 1973.

See also
National Register of Historic Places listings in Camden County, New Jersey

References

Houses on the National Register of Historic Places in New Jersey
Houses completed in 1743
Houses in Camden County, New Jersey
Cherry Hill, New Jersey
National Register of Historic Places in Camden County, New Jersey
New Jersey Register of Historic Places
1743 establishments in the Thirteen Colonies